KO PROPO is a brand of radio control equipment and humanoid robot (KHR-1) by Kondo Kagaku, established in Tokyo, Japan in 1945.

In 1982 KO PROPO introduced the Expert EX-1, reported to have been the first to integrate a pistol grip into a transmitter device with a gun trigger to act as the throttle, which later became a popular fixture in radio controlled transmitters.

 the company had won 32 IFMAR World titles.

References

External links 
 KO PROPO USA

Japanese companies established in 1945
Companies based in Tokyo
Radio-controlled transmitter
Robotics companies of Japan
Robotics in Japan
Science and technology in Japan
Japanese brands
Technology companies established in 1945